"Get Money" is a song by the American rap group Junior M.A.F.I.A., released as the third and final single from their debut album Conspiracy (1995). "Get Money," whose instrumental is fundamentally a sample of R&B singer Sylvia Striplin's 1981 song "You Can't Turn Me Away," was produced by EZ Elpee, rapped by the Notorious B.I.G. and Lil' Kim, and received a music video. B.I.G., formally, was featured, but at times was deemed, like Lil' Kim and Lil' Cease, a Junior M.A.F.I.A. member.

The single included also "Gettin' Money (the Get Money Remix)." Using a different instrumental, a sample of R&B singer Dennis Edwards's 1984 single "Don't Look Any Further," this was produced by DJ Enuff, Lance 'Un' Rivera, and the Notorious B.I.G., and includes new verses by B.I.G, Lil' Kim, and Lil' Cease. The single spent 20 weeks on the main popular songs chart, the Billboard Hot 100, where it entered on February 10 and peaked at #17 on May 25. Certified platinum, one million copies sold, "Get Money" ranked #89 in Billboard magazine's Top Hot 100 Hits of 1996.

As the "platinum smash" that reinforced Lil' Kim's performance on the gold hit "Player's Anthem," the single critically motivated her debut solo album, a November 1996 release. Meanwhile, spinning the original's Get money hook is the Take money refrain of rapper 2Pac's June 1996 single "Hit 'Em Up," the legendary diss track—answering B.I.G's renowned single "Who Shot Ya," a February 1995 release by Sean "Puffy" Comb's Bad Boy label—that maligns and menaces B.I.G. and Puffy, and shares an instrumental with the "Get Money" remix. "Get Money" has appeared elsewhere in music and in movies.

Music video
The music video was released for the week ending on January 7, 1996.

Single track listing

A-side
"Gettin' Money (The Get Money Remix)" (Radio Edit) – 3:59  
"Gettin' Money (The Get Money Remix)" (Dirty Version) – 4:09  
"Get Money" (Original Version) – 4:34

B-side
"White Chalk" (Original Version) – 4:40  
"White Chalk" (Dirty Version) – 4:40  
"Get Money" (Original Instrumental) – 4:34

Charts

Weekly charts

Year-end charts

Certifications

References

1995 songs
1996 singles
Junior M.A.F.I.A. songs
The Notorious B.I.G. songs
Songs written by the Notorious B.I.G.
Songs written by Lil' Kim
Gangsta rap songs